Dennis H. Carter was a Canadian architect and amateur filmmaker.

Both he and his partner Ernest Smith, with whom he founded Smith Carter, were, according to Jeffrey Thorsteinson, among several "significant modern architects" who graduated from the University of Manitoba's architecture program prior to 1946, and who were "vital to the rise of a notable regional strain of Canadian architecture" referred to as Manitoba modernism.

Death 
Dennis Carter died on 21 June 2012 at the Deer Lodge Centre, predeceased by Barbara and his brother Leslie.

Professional affiliations 
Royal Architectural Institute of Canada • Fellow (1963)
Manitoba Association of Architects • President (1966–67) • Life Member (2000)

Select publications 
 "Project for a recreation centre." Royal Architectural Institute of Canada Journal 22 (4) (April 1945): 80.

Notes

References

External links 
Dennis Carter on Memorable Manitobans

1920 births
2012 deaths
20th-century Canadian architects
Anglophone Quebec people
Businesspeople from Montreal